Petra Kvitová was the defending champion, but lost in the third round to Daria Gavrilova.

Simona Halep won the title, defeating Dominika Cibulková in the final, 6–2, 6–4.

Seeds

Draw

Finals

Top half

Section 1

Section 2

Bottom half

Section 3

Section 4

Qualifying

Seeds

Qualifiers

Lucky loser

Qualifying draw

First qualifier

Second qualifier

Third qualifier

Fourth qualifier

Fifth qualifier

Sixth qualifier

Seventh qualifier

Eighth qualifier

References
 Main Draw
 Qualifying Draw

Women's - Singles